Streptomyces ramulosus is a bacterium species from the genus of Streptomyces which has been isolated from soil. Streptomyces ramulosus produces acetomycin, beta-oxotryptamine, oxyplicacetin
and pepsinostreptin.

See also 
 List of Streptomyces species

References

Further reading

External links
Type strain of Streptomyces ramulosus at BacDive -  the Bacterial Diversity Metadatabase

ramulosus
Bacteria described in 1958